Tristan Peersman (born 28 September 1979 in Antwerp) is a Belgian footballer. He is a goalkeeper who is currently unattached. He formerly played for various clubs, including Anderlecht and Willem II. He was transferred to OFI Crete on 25 June 2007 but left the club the next year.

Since then, he has played for FC Dordrecht and R.A.E.C. Mons.

Personal life
Peersman's son Kjell Peersman is also a professional footballer.

References

Tristan Peersman Herk FC, nieuwsblad.be, 24 March 2012

External links
 
 

1979 births
Living people
Belgian footballers
Belgian expatriate footballers
Association football goalkeepers
K.S.K. Beveren players
R.S.C. Anderlecht players
Willem II (football club) players
OFI Crete F.C. players
Belgium international footballers
FC Dordrecht players
Belgian Pro League players
Eredivisie players
Super League Greece players
Expatriate footballers in the Netherlands
Expatriate footballers in Greece
Footballers from Antwerp
R.A.E.C. Mons players
Challenger Pro League players